Bhanu Pratap Singh Verma (born 15 July 1957) is an Indian politician and Minister of State in Ministry of Micro, Small and Medium Enterprises in Government Of India. He stood for the 1996 Lok Sabha elections as BJP candidate and is currently a Member of Parliament from Jalaun. He belong to the Koli community of Uttar Pradesh.

He won 1996, 1998, 2004, 2014, 2019 general election from Jalaun constituency.

Political career

1991-92: Member, Uttar Pradesh Legislative Assembly
1996 – 1998: Elected to 11th Lok Sabha
1998 – 1999: Re-elected to 12th Lok Sabha (2nd term)
2001: Vice-President, S.C Morcha, B.J.P., Uttar Pradesh; Member, National Council, B.J.P.
2004 – 2009: Re-elected to 14th Lok Sabha (3rd term)
2011 – 2013: President, B.J.P. SC Morcha, Uttar Pradesh
2014, 2019: Re-elected to 16th Lok Sabha (4th term)
12 June 2014 onwards: Member, House Committee
14 Aug. 2014 onwards: Member, Committee on Welfare of Scheduled Castes and Scheduled Tribes
1 Sep. 2014 onwards: Member, Standing Committee on Energy; Member, Consultative Committee, Ministry of Petroleum and Natural Gas
May 2019 onwards: re-elected to 17th Lok Sabha (5th term)

References

External links
 Official biography from Parliament of India records

1957 births
Living people
Bharatiya Janata Party politicians from Uttar Pradesh
People from Jalaun
India MPs 2004–2009
Lok Sabha members from Uttar Pradesh
Koli people
India MPs 2014–2019
India MPs 1996–1997
India MPs 1998–1999
India MPs 2019–present